Andrej Hieng (17 February 1925 – 17 January 2000) was a Slovene writer, playwright and theatre director.

Hieng was born in Ljubljana in 1925. He studied at the Academy of Performing Arts in Ljubljana between 1948 and 1952 and worked as a theatre director in Kranj, Celje and Ljubljana. As well as his plays, he is also known for his novels and short stories.

He received a number of awards including the Prešeren Foundation Award in 1967 for his novel Gozd in pečina, the Grand Prešeren Award in 1988 for his literary and dramatic opus and the Kresnik Award for his novel Čudežni feliks in 1994. In 1995 he was made a member of the Slovenian Academy of Sciences and Arts. He died in Ljubljana in 2000.

List of works

 Novele, short stories, (1954) 
 Usodni rob, short stories, (1957) 
 Planota, short stories, (1961) 
 Gozd in pečina, novel, (1966) 
 Orfeum, novel, (1972) 
 Čarodej, novel, (1976) 
 Obnebje metuljev, novel, (1980) 
 Čudežni feliks, novel, (1993)

Plays

 Cortesova vrnitev, drama (1969) 
 Burleska o Grku, drama (1969) 
 Gluhi mož na meji, drama (1969) 
 Osvajalec, drama (1971) 
 Lažna Ivana, comedy (1973) 
 Izgubljeni sin, comedy (1976) 
 Večer ženinov, drama (1979) 
 Krvava ptica, comedy (1980) 
 Nori malar, comedy (1980) 
 Dež v Piranu, drama (1982) 
 Zakladi gospe Berte, drama (1983) 
 Mark in Antonij, drama (1983)

References

External links
Biography (in Slovene) on publisher's site

1925 births
2000 deaths
Writers from Ljubljana
Prešeren Award laureates
Kresnik Award laureates
Members of the Slovenian Academy of Sciences and Arts
Slovenian dramatists and playwrights
Slovenian film directors
University of Ljubljana alumni
20th-century dramatists and playwrights